Stephen Minor (1760–1815) was an American plantation owner and banker in the antebellum South.

Early life
Stephen Minor was born on February 8, 1760, in Greene County, Pennsylvania.  One of his grandsons, John Minor, went on to live at the Oakland Plantation in Natchez.

Career
He moved to New Orleans, Louisiana, in 1779 and served as Captain in the Spanish Army. He then served as the Secretary to the Spanish Governor Manuel Gayoso de Lemos (1747–1799). In 1791, he received generous land grants from the Spanish government for his service.

He turned his land grants into nine plantations, including the Southdown Plantation in Terrebonne Parish, Louisiana, where he grew sugar cane. In 1797, his plantations produced twenty-five hundred bales of cotton. He became one of Natchez's richest residents in the 1810s and 1820s.

Additionally, he served as the first President of the Bank of Mississippi from 1797 to 1815.

Personal life
He resided in Natchez, Mississippi from 1780 to 1815. He purchased the Concord in Natchez, which burned down in 1901.

He married three times. His first wife was Anna Bingaman Minor. His second wife was Martha Ellis Minor. His third wife was Katherine Lintot Minor, the daughter of Bernard Lintot, "a founding member of the United States Mississippi Territory." They had three children.

Death
He died on November 29, 1815, in Natchez, Mississippi.

References

Further reading
Holmes, Jack D. L.. "Stephen Minor: Natchez Pioneer." Journal of Mississippi History. 42 (1980):17-26.

1760 births
1844 deaths
People from Carlisle, Pennsylvania
People from Natchez, Mississippi
Spanish army officers
American planters
American bankers